Government Engineering College, Bharatpur (now Engineering College, Bharatpur) is a government autonomous engineering college of Government of Rajasthan in Bharatpur, Rajasthan, India. It was established in 2007. 
At the outskirts of the city Bharatpur, GEC Bharatpur is located in the Golden Triangle (the tourist circuit that connects the national capital New Delhi, Agra and Jaipur) at National Highway No.-11. It was established in 2007. Since then it has constantly grown with a very fast pace. It is the first government engineering college in the Bharatpur division. The campus is spread over 40 acres.

Engineering colleges in Rajasthan
Educational institutions established in 2007
2007 establishments in Rajasthan

Vision

Empowerment through Knowledge, grounded in Indian Values.

Mission

To educate the students to transform them as professionally competent and quality conscious engineers by providing conducive environment for teaching, learning and overall personality development, culminating the institute into an international seat of excellence.

Objective
 To produce technically competent, quality conscious engineers.
 To develop functionally suitable and conducive environment for students and staff for academic purpose
 To develop the department into the centre of excellence.
 To develop post graduate centers for all branches.
 To implement Effective & efficient Teaching- Learning practices.
 To increase percentage of campus placements.
 To strengthen industry institute interaction.
 Help students for personality development and career guidance.
 To develop the students and staff to get international Acclamation.
 To develop an e-learning campus.

This institution offers only B.Tech. programs in five branches and well equipped common facilities.

Roadmap Of College

District Bharatpur is connected to nuhu district of Haryana on the north, Mathura and Agra districts of Uttar Pradesh on the east, Districts of Rajasthan; Dholpur on the south, Karauli on the southwest, and Dausa and Alwar on the west.